The F+W C-3605, nicknamed Schlepp ("Tug") or "Alpine Anteater", was a target towing aircraft operated by the Swiss Air Force from 1971–1987. The aircraft was developed during the latter half of the 1960s by the Swiss Federal Construction Works (Eidgenoessische Konstruktionswerkstaette) (EKW), renamed Farner Werke (F+W) in 1972, as a conversion of the existing C-3603 ground attack/target towing aircraft. Following a successful prototype conversion in 1968, 23 aircraft were converted between 1971–1973 with 2 still flying in private hands.

Development

In 1967 the Swiss Air Force determined that their C-3603-1 target-towing aircraft still had approximately 10 years of structural life remaining, but that the plane's Hispano-Suiza piston type engines were on the verge of wearing out, with replacements becoming scarce. The C-3603-1 was based on a World War II era ground attack design which had been inspired by the design of the Messerschmitt Bf 109.

Evaluations of various types of foreign aircraft were conducted to find a replacement; however, it was determined in 1965 that the most economical solution would be to re-engineer the existing aircraft with a modern turboprop engine. Accordingly, work began under the direction of Jean-Pierre Weibel to convert the 102nd C-3603 into the prototype C-3605.

The selected replacement engine was a Lycoming T53 turboprop. The remainder of the aircraft was left essentially unmodified. Early flight testing of the prototype began on 19 August 1968. During testing it was found that a third vertical stabiliser was also required.

Operational history
Flight testing showed that the prototype C-3605 possessed satisfactory flight characteristics, and the conversion of 23 C-3603 aircraft to C-3605 standard began. The aircraft were delivered by F+W between 1971 and January 1973. Whilst in the service of the Swiss Air Force the C-3605s were usually painted in conspicuous yellow-and-black striped, high-visibility colour schemes.

The plane operated faithfully in the target towing role, exceeding its expected 10 year structural life. However, by the mid 1980s, the aging aircraft had begun to show signs of airframe fatigue. This led to the decision to retire the type from service in 1987 with the surviving aircraft being sold off and replaced by converted Pilatus PC-9s in the target-towing role.

Radioactive engines
In 2021 it was found that the engines are slightly radioactive, due to thorium being used.

Survivors
C-3605s are displayed in several museums, including the Flieger Flab Museum (Aviation Museum) in Dübendorf, Switzerland and the Planes of Fame Museum in Chino, California. The C-3605 is also popular as a "warbird" with civilian owners.

 HB-RDH, C-509, Wk. 289. Airworthy conditions, based in Sion (LSGS) Switzerland. Operated by 46 Aviation S.A.
 HB-RDB, C-494, Wk. 274. Airworthy conditions, based in St. Gallen-Altenrhein (LSZR) Switzerland.

Operators

Swiss Air Force

Specifications (C-3605)

See also

References
Notes

Bibliography

External links

Das Virtuelle Luftfahrtmuseum 

FFA aircraft
1960s Swiss military utility aircraft
Single-engined tractor aircraft
Low-wing aircraft
Single-engined turboprop aircraft
Aircraft first flown in 1968
Triple-tail aircraft